Mavin Records (also known as the Supreme Mavin Dynasty) is a Nigerian music corporation record label founded by record producer and recording artist Don Jazzy on 8 May 2012. The label's inception came to fruition following the closure of Mo' Hits Records, a record label owned by the aforementioned producer and D'banj. The label is home to recording artists such as Korede Bello, Dr SID, D'Prince, Di'Ja, Johnny Drille, Ladipoe, DNA Twins, Rema, Crayon, Ayra Starr, Magixx, Boy spyce and Bayanni. It also houses producers such as Jazzy himself, Altims, London, Baby Fresh, and Andre Vibez. In 2014, DJ Big N became the label's official disc jockey. Tiwa Savage, Wande Coal, Reekado Banks and Iyanya were all formerly signed to the label. On 8 May 2012, the label released its compilation album Solar Plexus. In January 2019, Mavin Records secured a multi-million dollar investment from Kupanda Holdings, a subsidiary of Kupanda Capital and TPG Growth.

History

Signings, website launch, endorsements, and musical releases
Mavin Records started as a result of D'banj's departure from Mo' Hits. Prior to commenting on D'banj's exit from Mo' Hits, there were allegations that D'banj signed over Mo' Hits to Don Jazzy. In an interview with Sunday Punch, Don Jazzy addressed D'banj's departure from Mo Hits, saying, "We were working together, and all was going well." It got to a point where I looked at the situation and we both decided that it was not working, and we had to move on. Don Jazzy alluded to being hesitant about a name change. According to BellaNaija, the term "Mavin" describes someone who is gifted and skilled in any field. Upon establishing the rebranded record label, Don Jazzy said he sees Mavin Records as the powerhouse of music in Africa in the shortest possible time. After rebranding Mo' Hits to Mavin, Don Jazzy signed Nigerian singer Tiwa Savage. Pulse Nigeria reported that Jazzy admires the singer's work ethic and drive. Pulse Nigeria also reported that Mavin Records signed producers Aluko "Altims" Timothy and Sunday "BabyFresh" Enejere.
  
On May 7, 2012, the record label launched its official website and the Mavin league, a social networking site designed to cater to their fans worldwide. Don Jazzy signed endorsement deals with Samsung and Loya Milk after establishing the label, and Tiwa Savage also signed an endorsement deal with Pepsi. Within a year of becoming a revamped brand, the record label released "Take Banana" and "Oma Ga" as singles from its debut compilation album, Solar Plexus. In February 2014, Don Jazzy signed Di'Ja, Reekado Banks and Korede Bello to Mavin Records a week after each other. On May 1, 2014, Mavin Records released the hit single "Dorobucci" to critical acclaim. On February 25, 2015, Don Jazzy and Tiwa Savage both signed endorsement deals with Konga.com. On October 31, 2016, several media outlets in Nigeria reported that Iyanya signed a record deal with Mavin Records. Both Iyanya and Don Jazzy confirmed the report on Instagram. On February 28, 2017, Don Jazzy announced the signings of Johnny Drille, Ladipoe and DNA to Mavin Records. In March 2019, he also announced the signing of Rema to Mavin. On May 31, Mavin unveiled the signing of Crayon. The next day, the record label released the collaborative single "All is in Order." On January 21, 2021, the label unveiled the signing of Ayra Starr.

Departures

Wande Coal and IP theft controversy
Reports about Wande Coal's departure surfaced after he released and promoted the single "Kilaju" without the support of Mavin Records. On 5 November 2013, Wande Coal released a song titled "Baby Face" and said Shizzi produced it for him. Subsequently, Don Jazzy went on Twitter and accused Coal of intellectual property theft. He uploaded a studio demo of "Baby Face,"  which was supposedly recorded the previous year. Wande Coal tweeted several times, debunking Jazzy's allegations. He also tweeted a link to the "original" studio version of the song. Entertainment lawyer Demilade Olaosun spoke to Premium Times newspaper about intellectual property (IP). He said the song is a property of Mavin Records since it was produced, arranged and voiced by an official of the label. The lawyer also stated that since Wande Coal's recording contract was not made available to the public, speculations cannot be made about the IP of the recording sound. On 7 November 2013, Mavin Records sent out a press release officially announcing Wande Coal's departure. The press release came shortly after the Twitter feud between Don Jazzy and Wande Coal.

Iyanya, Reekado Banks and Tiwa Savage
In a radio interview with Beat FM in February 2018, Iyanya announced his exit from Mavin Records, saying, "I'm now signed to Temple Music, but I'm a Mavin for life. It was not a beef. I was there, and it was time to move on". On 7 December 2018, Reekado Banks announced his departure from Mavin Records after 5 years and launching of his independent outfit banks music on Instagram. In May 2019, Universal Music Group announced the signing of Tiwa Savage. During said announcement, it was revealed that Savage left Mavin Records. Don Jazzy congratulated Savage on her UMG signing and said she will forever be remembered at Mavin.

Accolades
Mavin Records was nominated for Best Record Label of the Year at the 2013 City People Entertainment Awards. The label won the aforementioned category at the 2014 City People Entertainment Awards.

Artists

Current acts

Former acts

Producers

Current producers
 Don Jazzy
 Altims
 Babyfresh

DJ's
 DJ Big N

Discography

Albums

Singles

Labels
Mavin Records owns, or has a joint share in, many of the record labels listed here.
Jonzing World
Blowtime Entertainment

Notes

References

External links

 
Nigerian record labels
Record labels established in 2012
Contemporary R&B record labels
Pop record labels